Democrat, Democrats, or Democratic may refer to:

Politics
A proponent of democracy, or democratic government; a form of government involving rule by the people.
A member of a Democratic Party:
Democratic Party (United States) (D)
Democratic Party (Cyprus) (DCY)
Democratic Party (Japan) (DP)
Democratic Party (Italy) (PD)
Democratic Party (Hong Kong) (DPHK)
Democratic Progressive Party (DPP)
Democratic Party of Korea
Democratic Party (disambiguation), for a full list
A member of a Democrat Party (disambiguation)
A member of a Democracy Party (disambiguation)
Australian Democrats, a political party
Democrats (Brazil), a political party
Democrats (Chile), a political party
Democrats (Croatia), a political party
Democrats (Gothenburg political party), in the city of Gothenburg, Sweden
Democrats (Greece), a political party
Democrats (Greenland), a political party
Sweden Democrats, a political party
 Supporters of political parties and democracy movements in Hong Kong and Macau:
Pro-democracy camp (Hong Kong)
Localist groups (Hong Kong)
Pro-democracy camp (Macau)

Places
 Democrat, California
 Democrat, Kentucky
 Democrat Gulch, a valley in Oregon
 Democratic Republic of Afghanistan
 Democratic Republic of the Congo
 German Democratic Republic
 People's Democratic Republic of Ethiopia
 Democratic People's Republic of Korea
 Lao People's Democratic Republic
 Federal Democratic Republic of Nepal
 Somali Democratic Republic
 People's Democratic Republic of Yemen

Films
 Democrats (film), a 2014 documentary about politics in Zimbabwe

See also
 Democracy (disambiguation)
 Democrat Party (disambiguation)
 Democracy Party (disambiguation)
 Democratic Party (disambiguation)
 Democrat Party (epithet), a political epithet used in the United States instead of the Democratic Party
 Demokrat Parti (disambiguation)
 Republicanism
 Monarchism